Yehiel Segal (1924 –1996) was an Israeli painter. He is mostly known for his watercolours and sketches.

Biography

Segal was born in Kishinev, and immigrated to Israel in 1932. He studied at the Avni Institute with Yehezkel Streichman and Avigdor Steimatzky. For 25 years, he worked at the water department of Rehovot.

Notes

References
 

1924 births
1996 deaths
Israeli watercolourists
20th-century Israeli painters
Romanian emigrants to Mandatory Palestine